Phlox nivalis is a species of flowering plant in the Polemoniaceae family, it is commonly known as the trailing phlox, but other common names include Pineland phlox, Pine phlox, and sweet trailing. It is native to the southeastern states, along with Texas, Utah, and Michigan.

Description 
Phlox nivalis is an evergreen perennial plant, meaning it lives longer than one year. It is typically semi woody, with thin stiff needle like stems, and prostrate low laying form. Flowers have five petals that, and are radially symmetric, with obvious spreading lobes, and a narrow floral tube. This species of Phlox differs from others due to its liking for acidic soils. The flowers of Phlox nivalis range from shades of purples, pinks, and a white variety. The five petals have bright vibrant colors at the ends and have darker color tubes or centers. The plant itself grows low to the ground forming mounds that spread along the ground. It flowers in the spring months of the year.

The leaves of Phlox nivalis are simple broadleaf evergreen leaves, that are approximately 3-6 inches in length. The glossy green leaves have an opposite or whorled leaf arrangement.

Distribution and habitat 
Phlox nivalis thrives in an array of habitat including the mountain, piedmont, and coastal plains, but it tends to prefer dry, hot, and sandy areas. In the southeast Phlox nivalis occurs in habitat including the sandhills and piedmont, but it is also known to thrive in pine forests as a form of ground cover in Texas forest. This species of Phlox tends to be drought resistant and does well in occasionally dry soils or sloped areas that drain relatively quickly.

Soil Ph doesn’t often have much of an effect on Phlox nivalis but it tends to prefer more neutral to acidic soils. It prefers loam and sandy soils as opposed to clays, due to the quick drainage.

Horticultural use 
Phlox nivalis is very popular garden plant due to its drought tolerance. It is often used to border walkways or paths, it can often be found in hanging baskets or containers, like planters or pots. It also known to attract hummingbirds which makes them favorable for hanging baskets.

Conservation status 
One subspecies of this plant, Phlox nivalis, ssp. texensis, the Texas trailing phlox or Texan phlox, is a federally listed endangered species in the United States. It is endemic to Texas, where there are fewer than 20 populations in three counties. At one time it was thought to be extinct. It was rediscovered in 1972. The restoration of the longleaf pine forest in Texas has helped Phlox nivalis ssp. texensis recover.

Wildlife 
Phlox nivalis is known to attract humming birds and it provides a food source for wildlife. Phlox nivalis is used occasionally in food plots for herbivore species like deer.

References

External links

nivalis
Flora of North America